Washington Township is a township in Story County, Iowa, USA.  As of the 2000 census, its population was 35,477.

Geography
According to the USGS, it contains five cemeteries: Ontario Cemetery, Ames Municipal Cemetery, Memorial Gardens Cemetery, College Cemetery and Sunday Cemetery.

 U.S. Route 69 runs north–south through the township and  U.S. Route 30 runs east–west.

Washington Township is adjacent to Franklin, Grant and Palestine townships.
 USGS Geographic Names Information System (GNIS)

External links
 US-Counties.com
 City-Data.com

Townships in Story County, Iowa
Townships in Iowa